Cotabato's 2nd congressional district is one of the three congressional districts of the Philippines in the province of Cotabato. It has been represented in the House of Representatives since 1987. The district covers eastern Cotabato bordering Bukidnon and Davao Region. It consists of the provincial capital city, Kidapawan, and the municipalities of Antipas, Arakan, Magpet, Makilala and President Roxas. Prior to redistricting in 2012, the district also included the municipalities of M'lang, Matalam and Tulunan. It is currently represented in the 19th Congress by Rudy S. Caoagdan of the Nacionalista.

Representation history

Election results

2022

2019

2016

2013

2010

See also
Legislative districts of Cotabato

References

Congressional districts of the Philippines
Politics of Cotabato
1987 establishments in the Philippines
Congressional districts of Soccsksargen
Constituencies established in 1987